Current Publishing is a British magazine publishing company based in Chiswick, London.

Summary 
Current Publishing was founded in 1998.  The company now publishes four titles: Current Archaeology, Current World Archaeology, Military History Monthly, and Minerva, in addition to several online services dedicated to archaeology, heritage, and sites of historical significance.

Current Publishing was founded by Andrew Selkirk, a Fellow of the Society of Antiquaries and former Vice-President of the Royal Archaeological Institute, who launched the first magazine, Current Archaeology, in 1967.  For its first 40 years, the publication was bi-monthly, becoming a monthly in 2007 up until the present day.  Current Archaeology now has over 14,000 subscribers worldwide.

Current World Archaeology was launched in 2003, with an international focus on archaeology from the first emergence of man down to the present day.  There are six editions published per year.

Military History Monthly was added to Current Publishing’s roster in October 2010 as Military Times before obtaining its current title in November 2011.  It is edited by Neil Faulkner, and covers all aspects of military history, from battles of the ancient world, up to more recent conflicts in Iraq and Afghanistan. There are 6 editions published each year.

Minerva, a magazine devoted to the art and archaeology of the ancient world, joined Current Publishing in 2020.

Media 
In addition to the physical publications, Current Publishing has several websites intended to complement the magazines with further information and discussion forums. Archaeology Live  is a major annual conference presenting the latest annual discoveries in archaeology, while in Travelling the Past   the Editor in Chief explores some of the world's greatest archaeological sites.

Team 
Rob Selkirk is the present Managing Director, Libby Selkirk is the Commercial Director and Andrew Selkirk is the Editorial Director.  The offices are situated in London.

References

External links
Current Publishing's Official website
Military History Monthly
Current Archaeology
Current World Archaeology

Magazine publishing companies of the United Kingdom
Archaeological organizations
Archaeology of the United Kingdom
Companies based in the London Borough of Hounslow
British companies established in 1998